Freedom is a 1982 Australian feature film directed by Scott Hicks, starring Jon Blake and Jad Capelja. It features the music of Don Walker and vocals by Michael Hutchence.

Plot
Ron is an Adelaide man in his early 20s struggling to find work after he is laid off from his machinist apprenticeship. Though his crass manner has been a hindrance, Ron blames others for blocking his dreams. He fantasises about driving a coastal road in a Porsche 911 with a girl in the passenger seat, following a black sedan driving erratically before driving into a ravine. Ron can sweet-talk his way into favourable situations, including joyriding in a Triumph Stag under the pretence of a test-drive.

Ron sees the Porsche from his dreams near his house. The driver is an old school friend, Annie. The two agree to meet later in the city, but when Ron overhears Annie on the phone implying she will seduce him to spite her lover, Ron steals the Porsche and leaves Adelaide.

Ron meets Sally at a service station. She asks if Ron can take her to Sedan, South Australia. She plans to retrieve her son who is in foster care there. Sally tries to snatch her son, but Ron aborts the plan when he hears police arriving, and he and Sally escape.

Ron accidentally runs down a policeman while escaping, and regrets his escapades. The following morning, Ron leaves a sleeping Sally and draws the police away from a nearby roadblock, but damages the Porsche's engine in the process. He finds himself on the same coast road from his dreams, even finding the black sedan wrecked at the bottom of the ravine. Noticing the incoming police, Ron pushes the Porsche into the ravine and escapes by hitchhiking back to retrieve Sally.

Cast
Jon Blake as Ron
Jad Capelja as Sally
Candy Raymond as Annie
Bud Tingwell as Cassidy
Max Cullen as factory clerk
Chris Haywood as Phil

Production
The movie was shot in May to June 1981 in the Adelaide area. Finance was provided by the South Australian Film Corporation, with additional investment from Filmco. 

It featured music by Cold Chisel's Don Walker and vocals by the then unknown lead singer of INXS, Michael Hutchence, backed by Liz Watters and Jason Currie. A single, "Speed Kills" / "Fascist Sounds" was released by WEA Records in 1982.

Scott Hicks later described making the film as:

Reception
Freedom was unsuccessful at the Australian box office and failed to generate attention internationally, aside from a run at the D. W. Griffith theatre in New York City on 14 February 1985. Domestically, the film grossed $157,000 in 1982, equivalent to $456,870 in 2009 dollars.

Critical reviews were mixed to negative. Susie Eisenhuth, writing for The Sun-Herald, compared the film to Terrence Malick's Badlands (1973), another love on the run film. She wrote that Freedom spends "too much time on cars" and too little time on its characters.  Neil Jillett in The Age wrote one of the few positive reviews, stating that the film is about "the fantasies and fears of the young and unemployed", and called it "whimsical and intriguing".

Home media
Freedom was released on VHS in the mid 1980s by Rigby Entertainment and was classified M15+. It was released on DVD in the 2000s by Umbrella Entertainment. It has been in and out of print since then. In the US, it was released on VHS by VidAmerica.

References

External links

Freedom at Oz Movies

Australian crime drama films
Films about automobiles
Films directed by Scott Hicks
1980s English-language films
Australian action drama films